Warren Darst Gill (December 21, 1878 – November 26, 1952), nicknamed "Doc", was a professional baseball player who played as a first baseman for the Pittsburgh Pirates during the 1908 Major League Baseball season. Gill graduated from Washington University.

Gill is best known for failing to touch second base in a game against the Chicago Cubs on September 4, 1908.  With the game tied at 0 in the bottom of the 10th, Chief Wilson stroked a two-out single that scored the winning run.  However, Johnny Evers saw that Gill did not touch second base.  Umpire Hank O'Day, the only umpire working the game that day, said he did not see it and called the game over with a Pirates victory.

Three weeks later on September 23, 1908, New York Giants player Fred Merkle repeated Gill's error during a game against the Cubs. The Cubs' capitalization of this error was followed by a losing streak which became known as the curse of Fred Merkle.

In 27 major league games, Gill posted a .224 batting average (17-for-76) with 10 runs and 14 RBIs. Defensively, he handled 244 total chances (237 putouts, 7 assists) at first base without an error for a perfect 1.000 fielding percentage.

References

External links

Story of the 1908 season with a section on Gill's play

1878 births
1952 deaths
People from Montgomery County, Indiana
Major League Baseball first basemen
Baseball players from Indiana
Pittsburgh Pirates players
Minor league baseball managers
Fort Scott Giants players
Cedar Rapids Rabbits players
Austin Senators players
Oklahoma City Mets players
Grand Rapids Wolverines players
Minneapolis Millers (baseball) players
Los Angeles Angels (minor league) players
Washington University Bears baseball players